Florian Kleinhansl (born 11 August 2000) is a German professional footballer who plays as a defender for  club VfL Osnabrück.

Club career
In July 2021, Kleinhansl signed for 3. Liga club VfL Osnabrück, with both the transfer fee and the contract length remaining undisclosed.

International career
Kleinhansl has represented Germany internationally at under-18 level.

References

External links

2000 births
Living people
German footballers
People from Nürtingen
Sportspeople from Stuttgart (region)
Footballers from Baden-Württemberg
Association football defenders
Stuttgarter Kickers players
VfB Stuttgart players
VfB Stuttgart II players
VfL Osnabrück players
3. Liga players
Regionalliga players
Oberliga (football) players
21st-century German people